Manchester Transport Museum may refer to:

 The Greater Manchester Museum of Transport, a transport museum in the Cheetham Hill area of Manchester, UK.
 The Manchester Transport Museum Society, operators of a museum tramway in Heaton Park, Manchester, UK.